Route nationale 31 (RN 31) is a primary highway in Madagascar of 129 km, running from Bealanana to the junction with the RN 6 near Andrafia.

It is entirely in the Sofia Region.

Selected locations on route
(north-east to south-west)

Bealanana
Ambatosia
Antsohihy near Andrafia - (intersection with RN 6 to Antsiranana or Mahajanga)

See also
List of roads in Madagascar
Transport in Madagascar

References

Roads in Madagascar
Roads in Sofia Region